Farzan or Farzān is a Persian masculine given name or a surname. The feminine equivalent is Farzaneh/Farzana.

Notable people with these names include:

Junior Farzan Ali (born 1980), Fijian boxer
Farzan Ashourzadeh (born 1996), Olympic taekwondo practitioner
Farzan Samsudeen (born 1984), Chartered Management Accountant
Farzan Athari (born 1984), Persian model
Antonia Farzan, American journalist  
Raja Farzan (born 1995), Pakistani cricketer  
Yasaman Farzan (born 1977), Iranian physicist
Taies Farzan (born 1980), German actress

Persian-language surnames
Persian masculine given names